"Black Sheep" is a song written by Danny Darst and Robert Altman, and recorded by American country music artist John Anderson.  It was released in September 1983 as the first single from the album All the People Are Talkin'.  The song was Anderson's third number one on the country chart.  "Black Sheep" went to number one for one week and spent a total of 14 weeks within the top 40.

Song story
In the song, a young man, one of four siblings, moans that he is the family's black sheep, while his older brother and little sister have become very successful – the brother as a prominent physician, the sister after marrying a successful banker – and often brag about the things they've been able to do with their money. (The lyrics also mention a "little brother" but there are no lyrics dedicated solely to him regarding his success.)

Meantime, the young man, an over-the-road truck driver, bemoans that he is only able to afford a two-room shack while his wife has to work to help make ends meet. Still, he seems to love his family, and tells her to "wake me up early, be good to my dogs and teach my children to pray."

Chart performance

References

1983 singles
John Anderson (musician) songs
Warner Records singles
1983 songs